is a Japanese footballer who plays for Tokyo Verdy.

Club statistics
Updated to 19 July 2022.

References

External links
Profile at Tokyo Verdy

1997 births
Living people
Association football people from Kanagawa Prefecture
Japanese footballers
J1 League players
J2 League players
Tokyo Verdy players
Vissel Kobe players
Association football midfielders